Joseph Ball (1649–1711) was an English-born justice, vestryman, lieutenant colonel, and Burgess in the Colony of Virginia.

Ball was the father of Mary Ball Washington and the maternal grandfather of George Washington, the First President of the United States.

Early life
Ball was born on May 2, 1649 in England to William Ball and Hannah Atherold.
His father William Ball (-1680) emigrated to Virginia in 1657 becoming a trader and planter, eventually settling with his family in Millenbeck, Virginia.

Settlement in Virginia colony
He moved to the Colony of Virginia sometime before 1680. He lived at the Epping Forest plantation in Lancaster County, Virginia. Ball served as justice in the county court, a vestryman for his church parish, and as a lieutenant colonel in the county militia. Ball was a representative in the Virginia House of Burgesses, serving in 1698, 1700, and 1702.

Personal life
Ball married twice. His first marriage was to Elizabeth Rogers (or Romney), with whom he had five children: Anne Ball, Elizabeth Ball, Esther or Easter Ball, Hannah Ball, and Joseph Ball. 

Rogers died in the early 1700s. After her death, Ball married Mary Johnson. Johnson was a widow who had two children from a prior marriage. Ball and Johnson had one child, Mary Ball, in 1708. Joseph Ball died on July 11, 1711 and is buried in Saint Mary's Whitechapel Episcopal Churchyard in Lancaster County, Virginia.

See also 

 Washington family

References 

House of Burgesses members
1649 births
1711 deaths